SGPTA PU College is a pre-university college in  Bangalore, Karnataka, India. It is affiliated to Karnataka Pre-University Education Board. It is located in APK Road, Thyagaraja Nagar

Streams offered
The College offers courses in the below mentioned science streams
1. PCMB - Physics, Chemistry, Mathematics, Biology
2. PCMC - Physics, Chemistry, Mathematics, Computer Science 
3. CEBA - Computer Science, Economics, Business Studies, Accountancy
4. SEBA - Statistics, Economics, Business Studies, Accountancy

Facilities
1.	Well Equipped  Laboratories
2.	Library
3.	Canteen

References

Pre University colleges in Karnataka